Sir Thomas Lyttelton, 1st Baronet (1593 – 22 February 1650) was an English Royalist officer and politician from the Lyttelton family during the English Civil War.

Biography
Thomas Lyttelton, born in 1593, was the eldest son of Sir John Lyttelton and inherited the family estates in Frankley, Halesowen, Hagley, and Upper Arley from his mother, Meriel, the daughter of Sir Thomas Bromley, Lord Chancellor of England. The estates had been restored to her by James I after their forfeiture due to his father's conviction of high treason.

Lyttelton was educated at Balliol College, Oxford and the Inner Temple (1613) and created a baronet in 1618. He was elected a Member of parliament for Worcestershire in 1620–1622, 1624–1626, and the Short Parliament of 1640.

During the First English Civil War Lyttelton was Colonel of the Worcestershire Horse and Foot for the King in 1642. He was taken prisoner by Tinker Fox at Bewdley in 1644, imprisoned in the Tower of London and fined £4,000.

Lyttelton died in 1650 and is buried in Worcester Cathedral.

Family
Lyttelton married Catherine, daughter and heiress of Sir Thomas Crompton, of Driffield, Yorks. They had twelve sons and four daughters of whom five sons and three daughters died while children. The survivors were:
Henry (1624–1693) was a Royalist officer during the English Civil War and an MP from 1678 to 1679.
Charles (1629–1716) Royalist who defended Colchester inherited the baronetcy from his elder brother Henry.
 Edward, killed in a duel at Worcester, unmarried.
 Constantine (died 1662), died in Jamaica without any children.
 William, a gentleman usher to the Queen of Bohemia.
Ferdinando (born ) Groom of the Bedchamber to James, Duke of York, entered French military service, was the first Lieutenant-Colonel of the English Regiment of Light Horse in France, and was killed in battle near Strasbourg.
 George (died 1712), a major in Prince George of Denmark's regiment, died without children.
 Catherine (died 1691), unmarried.

Notes

References
 

1593 births
1650 deaths
Baronets in the Baronetage of England
Members of the Parliament of England for Worcestershire
Cavaliers
Thomas
Prisoners in the Tower of London
English MPs 1621–1622
English MPs 1624–1625
English MPs 1625
English MPs 1626
English MPs 1640 (April)